Bellingham Boyle (1709-1771) was an Irish politician.

Boyle was educated at Trinity College, Dublin. From 1731 until 1761, he was MP for Bandonbridge;
and from 1761 to 1768 for Youghal.

References

Alumni of Trinity College Dublin
Members of the Parliament of Ireland (pre-1801) for County Cork constituencies
Irish MPs 1727–1760
Irish MPs 1761–1768
1709 births
1771 deaths